The Annual Review of Biophysics is a peer-reviewed scientific journal published annually by Annual Reviews. It covers all aspects of biophysics with solicited review articles. Ken A. Dill has been its editor since 2013. According to the Journal Citation Reports, the journal has a 2021 impact factor of 19.763 ranking it first out of 72 journals in the category "Biophysics".

History
The Annual Review of Biophysics and Bioengineering was first published in 1972 by Annual Reviews in collaboration with the Biophysical Society. Its inaugural editor was Manuel F. Morales. In 1985, the name of the journal was changed to Annual Review of Biophysics and Biophysical Chemistry, followed by another name change in 1992 to Annual Review of Biophysics and Biomolecular Structure. In 2008 the journal obtained its current title.

Abstracting and indexing
The journal is abstracted and indexed in Scopus, Science Citation Index Expanded, BIOSIS Previews, Embase, MEDLINE, and Academic Search, among others.

Editorial processes
The journal is helmed by the editor or the co-editors. The editor is assisted by the editorial committee, which includes associate editors, regular members, and occasionally guest editors. Guest members participate at the invitation of the editor, and serve terms of one year. All other members of the editorial committee are appointed by the Annual Reviews board of directors and serve five-year terms. The editorial committee determines which topics should be included in each volume and solicits reviews from qualified authors. Unsolicited manuscripts are not accepted. Peer review is undertaken by the editorial committee.

Volume editors
Dates indicate publication years in which someone was credited as a lead editor or co-editor of a journal volume. The planning process for a volume begins well before the volume appears, so appointment to the position of lead editor generally occurred prior to the first year shown here. An editor who has retired or died may be credited as a lead editor of a volume that they helped to plan, even if it is published after their retirement or death.
Manuel F. Morales (1972)
Lorin J. Mullins (1973–1983) 
Donald M. Engelman (1984–1993)
Robert M. Stroud (1994–2003)
Douglas C. Rees (2004–2012)
Douglas C. Rees and Ken A. Dill (2013–2014)
Ken A. Dill (2015–present)

See also
 List of physics journals

References

External links

 

Biophysics
Biophysics journals
Publications established in 1972
Annual journals
English-language journals
Physics review journals